Span Oak Run is a stream in the U.S. state of West Virginia.

Span Oak Run was named after a fallen tree which once spanned the creek.

See also
List of rivers of West Virginia

References

Rivers of Pocahontas County, West Virginia
Rivers of West Virginia